Pradhanmantri Sangrahalaya is a museum built as a tribute to every Prime Minister of India since Independence, and a narrative record of how each one has contributed to the development of the nation.
The museum is located at the Teen Murti Avenue earlier known as Nehru Memorial Museum and Library with renovated buildings and newly redeveloped new galleries. The Museum has two main buildings and each building has a reception at entrance. Each building of the museum houses galleries dedicated to each Prime Minister of India showcasing their major and significant contributions towards building of a nation. The museum also houses galleries of Constitution and its making, memorable debates.

Gallery

References

Prime ministers
Government of India